Ahrweiler BC is a German football club from the city of Bad Neuenahr-Ahrweiler, Rheinland-Pfalz. The club was established in January 1920 as Fußballverein Ahrweiler and adopted the name Ahrweiler Ballspiel-Club on 10 March 1925.



History
Following World War II BC merged with gymnastics and sports club Turn- und Sport 1898 Ahrweiler to form Rasen-Vereinigung 98 Ahrweiler. That union lasted until 23 March 1949 when the two clubs again went their separate ways. BC has remained an unheralded local side for most of its existence having made just two single season appearances in the Amateurliga Rheinland (III) in 1972–73 and 1974–75. Tied for 13th place with VfB Lützel and Eintracht Höhr-Grenzhausen at the end of the 1973 season Ahrweil lost a relegation play-off and was sent down. Their 1974–75 campaign was also unsuccessful and it too ended in relegation.

The club became a founding member of the Verbandsliga Rheinland (IV) in 1978 and stayed in this league until 1986, a fourth place in 1981–82 being its best result. It earned promotion back to this league in 1987, finishing runners-up to VfB Wissen in its first season back. In 1995–96, the club finished third in the league but in 1999, it suffered another relegation, back to the Bezirksliga.

In 2006, BC joined SC 07 Bad Neuenahr in a sports co-operative known as SG Ahrweiler/Bad Neuenahr which fields combined first and second teams. The club played in the tier seven Bezirksliga Rheinland-Mitte until consecutively being relegated in 2013 and 2014 but recovered with a league championship in the Kreisliga B Ahr in 2015–16. In 2018 the club played in Bezirksliga Mitte and became the League's winning team, getting promoted to the Rheinlandliga. In their first season 2018/19 Ahrweiler BC ranked second place being qualified to the Qualification matches against FV Dudenhofen and SF Köllerbach.

References

External links
Official team site
Das deutsche Fußball-Archiv historical German domestic league tables 

Football clubs in Germany
Football clubs in Rhineland-Palatinate
Association football clubs established in 1920
1920 establishments in Germany